Cool McCool is a Saturday morning animated series that ran on NBC from September 10, 1966 to January 21, 1967, with three segments per show, in all consisting of sixty segments. It was created by Bob Kane – who was most famous as one of the creators of Batman – and produced by Al Brodax for King Features.

The show was drawn in Australia, with Artransa Park Film Studios completing the bulk of the animation. Due to the quick turn-around times required by the rapid production schedule, further animation was completed by other Australian artists such as Gus McLaren and Eric Porter Studios.

Description
Riffing off the then-popular genres of superheroes and James Bond spy adventures, Cool McCool featured the adventures of a hip, trenchcoated spy, who – as on the contemporary TV show Get Smart – defeated villains despite being comically inept. Villains included the Rattler, Hurricane Harry, the Owl, Jack-In-The-Box, and Dr. Madcap.

McCool's boss was known as Number One, although his face was never seen onscreen; only his arms and a cigar were visible behind his chair. Number One's secretary was Friday, a dumpy girl who had an unrequited crush on the secret agent.

McCool has three catchphrases: "Danger is my business!" "When you're right, Number One, you're right", and (after bungling something) "That will never happen again, Number One" (Of course, it usually does.).

The show also featured a Keystone Kops-style segment featuring the adventures of McCool's father, Harry McCool, a uniformed police officer, presumed to have taken place decades before Cool's time.  Harry was supported by his brothers Dick and Tom.  The Cool McCool character sang the theme song to his father's segments, which ended with his proclaiming, in a plaintive voice, "My Pop ... the cop."  Only 20 Harry McCool segments were made, each one sandwiched between the two Cool McCool segments per show.

Cast
Cool and Harry were voiced by Bob McFadden, while most of the other voices were supplied by Chuck McCann.  Carol Corbett provided the voices of the female characters.  McFadden modeled McCool's voice after comic legend Jack Benny.

Secret, Inc.
Cool McCool: A secret agent who takes several risks to save the world. Despite his powerful skills and super-spy abilities, he can be bumbling, foolish and clumsy at times (but also supernaturally lucky, so attempts on his life keep backfiring on his adversaries). He drives a modified car called the "Coolmobile" (which can also transform into a jet plane or a submarine), which he summons by whistling. His mustache tingles when there's danger lurking and can also be used as a telephone to contact Number One. A running gag in the series is that after the end of each mission, despite being successful (often in spite of his own bumbling), Cool would do something that would make Number One mad, thus causing him to get ejected. His catchphrases are "Danger is my business!", "When you're right, Number One, you're right" and "That will never happen again, Number One." He is voiced by Bob McFadden.
Number One: Cool's boss. Whenever Cool does something really stupid, he ejects him from the headquarters by means of a control dashboard at his desk. An office chair, footstool, file cabinet, water cooler and/or coat rack suddenly come to life when Number One starts pushing buttons, attacking and disposing of McCool in hasty, violent fashion. Always obscured by his huge chair, the only part of Number One ever shown are his arms, hands and a cigar. His real name is never revealed. He is voiced by Chuck McCann.
Mr. Riggs: Secret Inc.'s technician and repairman. He regularly makes prototypes of devices that are supposed to help McCool, but instead, backfire or hurt him – and yet Number One usually blames McCool for their failure. He is voiced by Chuck McCann.
Friday: Number One's secretary who has a crush on Cool. She is mostly a klutz. She is voiced by Carol Corbett.
Breezy: Cool McCool's adolescent sidekick who aids him on some occasions. He is always there on the job when Cool is in trouble. He wears a trenchcoat like Cool and has hair covering his eyes, a hat, a buck tooth and a soft voice. Unlike Cool, he makes few mistakes and is not as accident prone. He is voiced by Chuck McCann.

Harry McCool segment (Komedy Kops)
These segments were flashbacks, supposed to have taken place years or decades before Cool's time. At the end of every first Cool McCool segment, Cool sings about his recent missions and that he should be more like his father (a uniformed police officer who was even more of a bumbler), and the flashback segment starts.

Harry McCool: Cool's father, who along with his brothers Dick and Tom (Cool's uncles), were the Komedy Kops, a take-off on the Keystone Kops. He is the tallest and most intelligent member of the trio, thus the de facto leader, occupying the first seat in their chosen mode of transportation, a three seater bicycle. Like his son, Harry is voiced by Bob McFadden.
Dick McCool: The rotund brother of Harry and Tom rides in the middle seat of their bike. He is often befuddled by Tom's gibberish, so his catchphrase question is, "What did he say, Harry? What did he say?" He is voiced by Chuck McCann.
Tom McCool: The shorter brother of Harry and Dick has a bushy black mustache and hair that covers his eyes. He rides in the bicycle's back seat. He speaks in gibberish that only Harry seems to understand. He is voiced by Chuck McCann.

Villains
Cool McCool's enemies. Although each villain normally acts independently (aside from married couple Dr. Madcap and Greta Ghoul who work together), the in-between sequences introducing Harry McCool shows them united in their quest to capture Cool McCool (they are usually outwitted nevertheless).

The Owl: A barefooted, owl-themed human supervillain who is the first antagonist Cool McCool encounters in the series. He lives in a cave with pet owls and (in the debut episode) a cat-themed evil girlfriend named Pussycat (voiced by Corbett). He has the ability to command the bird kingdom to do his evil bidding. The Owl is a parody of the Penguin and is voiced by Chuck McCann.
The Rattler: A snake-like, green cyber-human villain with a passion for the arts. He hisses and slithers, and can communicate with and control plant life. The Rattler is also known to wield shotguns and bombs. He is a parody of the Riddler, although his ability to control plant life also makes him a bit of an analog for Poison Ivy.  He is voiced by Chuck McCann.
Dr. Madcap: A wacky foe with the ability to control all hats and make them do his dirty work. He adores both his collection of hats and Greta Ghoul, his wife. He is a parody of the Mad Hatter from Batman. Madcap's hats sometimes contain deadly surprises such as anvils or guns. He is voiced by Chuck McCann.
Greta Ghoul: Dr. Madcap's wife, who does not always feel appreciated or loved by her husband. She is a light gray-skinned woman who is often moody and depressed. Her vampire voice is done by Carol Corbett, in an impression of Greta Garbo who the character is modeled after.
Hurricane Harry: An overweight human wind bag who uses lung power to create mighty gusts that can blow anything out of his path. He speaks in a deep voice and a lisp. His fiancée is Bellows Belle (Carol Corbett), who wheezes when speaking. Harry's one weakness is his buck tooth, which, when accidentally knocked out of his mouth, causes him to rapidly deflate like a balloon.  He does not appear to be a parody of any Batman villains. He is voiced by Chuck McCann.
Jack-in-a-Box: A maniacal crook in red-and-yellow jester attire that hides in a jack-in-a-box to scare and attack his victims. His weapons include a shotgun, grenades filled with laughing gas, and spring-loaded shoes. Whenever he speaks, his waist bounces up and down and his voice vibrates like a jack-in-a-box spring. He is a parody of the Joker, voiced by Chuck McCann.

Episode list

DVD & VHS

Rhino records
 Cool McCool Collection – 2003 DVD oop

Hollywood DVD
 Cool McCool: How To Catch a Crook – 2003 UK PAL DVD oop
 Cool McCool: Danger is My Business / G-Force – 2004 UK PAL DVD oop
 Cool McCool: Danger is my Business / Felix the Cat – 2004 UK PAL DVD oop

Best Film & Video Co
 Cool McCool: Shooting the Breeze – 1990 VHS oop
 Cool McCool: Grime & Punishment – 1990 VHS oop
 Cool McCool: How to Catch a Crook – 1990 VHS oop

BCI Eclipse
 Animated All Stars vol. 1 – 2006 2DVD – (two Cool McCool episodes)
 Cool McCool: The Complete Series – 3DVD March 13, 2007
 "Advantage Cartoon Mega Pack"- DVD set includes 6 Cool McCool episodes along with Magical Adventures of Quasimodo, Barney Google & Snuffy Smith, Hagar the Horrible, Krazy Kat, Betty Boop, etc

References

External links 
 
 

NBC original programming
1960s American animated television series
1966 American television series debuts
1967 American television series endings
Fictional secret agents and spies
American children's animated comedy television series
Television series created by Bob Kane